Blake Cederlind (born January 4, 1996) is an American professional baseball pitcher in the Pittsburgh Pirates organization. He made his MLB debut in 2020.

Amateur career
Cederlind attended Turlock High School in Turlock, California, where he played baseball and was teammates with Brett Cumberland and Kevin Kramer. In 2014, his senior year, he went 8–1 with a 1.50 ERA along with batting .289. He was not drafted out of high school in the 2014 Major League Baseball draft, and he enrolled at Merced College where he played college baseball.

As a freshman at Merced in 2015, Cederlind went 3–1 with a 7.89 ERA over  innings. After the year, he was selected by the Minnesota Twins in the 22nd round of the 2015 Major League Baseball draft but did not sign. In 2016, his sophomore year at Merced, he appeared in 23 games (making four starts) in which he compiled a 5–2 record and 3.75 ERA while striking out 63 batters in  innings. Following the season, the Pittsburgh Pirates selected Cederlind in the fifth round the 2016 Major League Baseball draft.

Professional career
Cederlind signed with Pittsburgh for $285,000, and was assigned to the Bristol Pirates. Over six starts, he went 0–1 with a 4.67 ERA. In 2017, Cederlind spent the season with the West Virginia Power where he pitched to a 2–3 record and 7.76 ERA over 25 games (seven starts), striking out 55 batters over 58 innings. He returned to West Virginia to begin the 2018 season and was promoted to the Bradenton Marauders in June. Over  innings between both teams, he pitched to a 4–4 record and 4.89 ERA while striking out 54 batters. Cederlind returned to Bradenton to begin 2019 before being promoted to the Altoona Curve in May. In August, he was promoted to the Indianapolis Indians with whom he finished the season. Over 41 relief appearances between the three clubs, Cederlind went 5–2 with a 2.28 ERA, striking out 55 over  innings.

Cederlind was added to the Pirates 40-man roster following the 2019 season. On July 5, 2020, it was announced that Cederlind had tested positive for COVID-19. On September 15, Cederlind was promoted to the major leagues for the first time and made his debut against the Cincinnati Reds.

On March 12, 2021, Cederlind was placed on the 60-day injured list due to a strained ulnar collateral ligament in his right elbow. On March 23, 2021, Cederlind underwent Tommy John surgery, causing him to miss the 2021 season. On November 10, 2022, Cederlind was sent outright off the 40-man roster.

References

External links

1996 births
Living people
People from Turlock, California
Baseball players from California
Major League Baseball pitchers
Pittsburgh Pirates players
Merced Blue Devils baseball players
Bristol Pirates players
West Virginia Power players
Bradenton Marauders players
Altoona Curve players
Indianapolis Indians players
Peoria Javelinas players